Bombay Mail is a 1934 American pre-Code drama film directed by Edwin L. Marin and written by Tom Reed. The film stars Edmund Lowe, Ralph Forbes, Shirley Grey, Hedda Hopper, Onslow Stevens, and Jameson Thomas. The film was released on January 6, 1934, by Universal Pictures. The film is based on the Lawrence Blochman novel of the same name which was originally published in 1933 in the pulp magazine Complete Stories.

According to Lal Chand Mehra, an Indian who acted in and advised numerous Hollywood films in the first half of the 20th century, the entire movie was filmed in elaborate sets. "it was necessary to build an entire Indian train —the ‘Imperial Indian Mail'—to construct several stations and to see that each and every character, from brahmins to untouchables, were correctly costumed and correctly dressed", he said in an interview in the Madera Tribune.

Plot
The governor of Bengal is assassinated on the Bombay Mail somewhere between Calcutta and Bombay and it is up to Inspector Dyke (Edmund Lowe) to solve that murder as well as a couple of later murders. The cast of characters include the governor's wife (Hedda Hopper), his two secretaries, a gambler, an entertainer who is not quite what she seems (Shirley Grey), a mineralogist on his way to claim a ruby field, a pickpocket, an anti-British agitator, and a cobra.

Cast 
Edmund Lowe as Inspector Dyke
Ralph Forbes as William Luke-Patson
Shirley Grey as Beatrice Jones aka Sonia Smeganoff
Hedda Hopper as Lady Daniels
Onslow Stevens as John Hawley
Jameson Thomas as Capt. Gerald Worthing
Ferdinand Gottschalk as Governor Sir Anthony Daniels
Tom Moore as Civil Surgeon
John Wray as Giovanni Martini
John Davidson as R. Xavier
Georges Renavent as Dr. Maurice Lenoir
Herbert Corthell as Edward J. Breeze
Brandon Hurst as Pundit Garnath Chundra
Walter Armitage as Maharajah of Zungore
Garry Owen as Cuthbert Neal

Reception
The New York Times called it "an agreeably effective little shiver item" that would keep its "audience in a state of confusion" with its plot twists and deaths. The Michigan Daily compared it unfavorably to Shanghai Express but without the presence of Marlene Dietrich and commented on the "unnatural settings" and "decidedly unlike a train interior", ending with an "it could be worse". Later reviewers are more favorable. Michael Pitt called it "unjustly overlooked today" and found it to be a "fast-paced" and entertaining. In particular, Pitt points to the performance of Lowe, calling it superb, and "one of his best starring efforts". Bernard Dick called it an early version of the "railway thriller" and that, even though Laemmle had made a B movie, it had class.

The film was banned by the British authorities in India and in Singapore. In India, because it showed the murder of a maharaja and in Singapore because it showed the killing of a government official. Two of Roemheld's scores from the film, "Shirley Theme #3" and "Bombay Station," were reused in the late 1930s by Universal Pictures in its Flash Gordon series.

Notes

References

External links 
 

1934 films
1930s English-language films
American drama films
1934 drama films
Universal Pictures films
Films directed by Edwin L. Marin
American black-and-white films
Films scored by Heinz Roemheld
1930s American films